William Overall Yager (April 3, 1833 – January 20, 1904) was, during the American Civil War, initially the major and commanding officer of Yager's Third Battalion Texas Mounted Volunteers, and then later, as colonel and commanding officer of the First Texas (Yager's) Cavalry (CSA), and, in postwar years, member of the Virginia House of Delegates and the Senate of Virginia, Superintendent of Schools, and Treasurer for Page County, Virginia.

Early life 
Yager was born and raised in Page County, Virginia, a son of Nicholas Wesley Yager and Christina Williams Overall Yager.

In 1848, he matriculated at the Virginia Military Institute, graduating four years later, fifth in his class, with fellow Page countians Simeon Beauford Gibbons and Hiram Jackson Strickler, as well as later Confederate notables, Thomas T. Munford, James A. Walker, Joseph C. Mayo, and George Smith Patton Sr. One of the signatures on his diploma was that of Thomas Jonathan Jackson.

Kansas, Texas, and marriage 
Following graduation, Yager worked briefly as a banker in Virginia, and soon after traveled to Kansas with fellow Page countian and VMI classmate Hiram Jackson Strickler, taking with him several slaves, including a valet. While in Kansas, Strickler and Strickler had real estate transactions together, most apparently being in Shawnee County. As part of the many transactions, Yager conveyed one-half interest in Lucknow to Strickler, and Strickler conveyed one-half interest in Bellmont to Yager.

Relocating to Texas, Yager settled in Seguin, Guadalupe County, where he met Mary Elizabeth Rhodes, whom he married in 1863. Rhodes could also claim roots in Yager's native county, being a descendant of John Rhodes, who had been killed in an Indian massacre in the county in the mid-18th century. The couple later had one son and four daughters.

The Civil War years 
Yager joined the Confederate service as a 1st lieutenant, in April, 1861, and served initially as adjutant for the First Regiment, Texas Mounted Rifles, also known as McCulloch's Regiment. He spent the autumn and winter of 1861 with this unit in Central Texas and engaged in sporadic negotiations and skirmishes with local Indian groups. In December 1861, McCulloch recommended Yager as commander of a cavalry battalion, and, when the First Regiment was reduced to a battalion of five companies and re-designated the Eighth Texas Cavalry Battalion, in April 1862, Yager was Yager was authorized to form his new cavalry battalion. This unit, when organized, was designated the Third Texas Cavalry Battalion, also referred to as Yager's Third Battalion Texas Mounted Volunteers. When the Eighth and Third Texas Cavalry Battalions were consolidated, on May 2, 1863, and renamed the First Texas Cavalry Regiment, Yager was promoted to lieutenant colonel, and second in command, with Col. Augustus Buchel as commanding officer. Following Buchel's mortal in action at the Battle of Pleasant Hill, Louisiana, on April 9, 1864, Yager was elevated to colonel and command of the regiment. Yager held this post until the end of the war.

Postwar 
Following the Civil War, Yager remained in Texas, into the 1870s, before returning with his family to his native Page County. In subsequent years, he served as representative for the county in the Virginia House of Delegates (1874–1875) and the Virginia Senate (1879–80). At the end of his term in the senate, Yager became active in county affairs, first serving as Superintendent of Schools (1880), and later as Treasurer of Page Co. (1884–1896). Yager died in Page County, on January 20, 1904, and was buried in the Yager family crypt in Luray, Virginia.

References

Lester N. Fitzhugh, "Saluria, Fort Esperanza, and Military Operations on the Texas Coast, 1861–1864", Southwestern Historical Quarterly 61(July 1957).
Stanley S. McGowen, Horse Sweat and Powder Smoke: The First Texas Cavalry in the Civil War (College Station: Texas A&M University Press, 1999).
James A. Mundie Jr., with Bruce S. Allardice, Dean E. Letzring, and John H. Luckey, Texas Burial Sites of Civil War Notables: A Biographical and Biographical and Pictorial Field Guide (Hillsboro, Texas: Hill College Press, 2002).

External links

1833 births
1904 deaths
People from Page County, Virginia
School superintendents in Virginia
Virginia Military Institute alumni
People of Virginia in the American Civil War
Confederate States Army officers
Members of the Virginia House of Delegates
Virginia state senators
19th-century American politicians